Ian Rhodes (born 7 July 1968) is a British sailor. He competed at the 1992 Summer Olympics and the 1996 Summer Olympics.

References

External links
 

1968 births
Living people
British male sailors (sport)
Olympic sailors of Great Britain
Sailors at the 1992 Summer Olympics – Tornado
Sailors at the 1996 Summer Olympics – Tornado
Sportspeople from Kent